El Dorado is a mythical city of gold.

El Dorado or Eldorado may also refer to:

Places

Argentina
 Eldorado, Misiones
 Eldorado Department

Brazil
 Eldorado (Belo Horizonte Metro)
 Eldorado, São Paulo
 Eldorado, Mato Grosso do Sul
 Eldorado do Sul

Canada
 Eldorado, Ontario
 Eldorado, Saskatchewan
 Eldorado Creek, a creek that runs by the former gold rush town Grand Forks, Yukon

Colombia
 El Dorado, Meta
 El Dorado International Airport, Bogotá, Colombia

United States
 El Dorado, Arkansas
 El Dorado, California 
 Eldorado, Georgia
 Eldorado, Illinois
 Eldorado, Iowa
 El Dorado, Kansas
 Eldorado, Maryland
 Eldorado, Michigan
 Eldorado, Nebraska
 El Dorado, Nevada, a ghost town
 Eldorado, New Mexico, also called Eldorado, a census-designated place
 Eldorado, Ohio 
 Eldorado, Oklahoma 
 Eldorado, Pennsylvania
 Eldorado, Texas
 El Dorado, Houston, Texas
 Eldorado, Wisconsin, a town 
 Eldorado (community), Wisconsin, an unincorporated community
 El Dorado County, California
 El Dorado AVA, California wine region in El Dorado County
 Eldorado Glacier, Washington
 El Dorado Hills, California
 Eldorado Mountain, a summit of the Rocky Mountains near Eldorado Springs, Colorado
 Eldorado Peak, Washington
 Mountain Ranch, California, formerly El Dorado
 Eldorado River, Alaska
 Eldorado Springs, Colorado
 El Dorado Springs, Missouri
 Eldorado Township (disambiguation)

Elsewhere
 Eldorado, Victoria, Australia
 El Dorado, Sinaloa, Mexico
 El Dorado Province, San Martín Region, Peru
 Eldorado, Limpopo, South Africa
 El Dorado, Trinidad and Tobago, a town in Trinidad and Tobago
 El Dorado, Uruguay
 El Dorado, Venezuela
 Eldorado, Zimbabwe

Arts, entertainment and media

Films
 El Dorado (1921 film), a French silent film by Marcel L'Herbier
 El Dorado (1963 film), an Israeli film by Menahem Golan
 El Dorado (1966 film), an American film directed by Howard Hawks starring John Wayne and Robert Mitchum
 El Dorado (1988 film), a Spanish film by Carlos Saura
 Eldorado, a 1995 Canadian film by Charles Binamé
 The Road to El Dorado, a 2000 animated film by Bibo Bergeron and Don Paul
 Eldorado (2008 film), a Belgian film by Bouli Lanners
 Eldorado (2012 film), a British film by Richard Driscoll
 Eldorado (2018 film), a Swiss documentary film

Literature
 El Dorado, a 2007 verse novel by Dorothy Porter
 Eldorado (novel), a 1913 novel, part of The Scarlet Pimpernel series by Baroness Orczy
 "Eldorado" (poem), an 1849 poem by Edgar Allan Poe
 Eldorado (poetry collection), a 1928 collection of poems by J. Slauerhoff

Music

Groups and labels
 El Dorado (band), a Japanese rock band
 Eldorado (band), a hard rock band from Spain
 Eldorado Recording Studios, a recording studio in Burbank, California

Albums
 Eldorado (Electric Light Orchestra album) (1974)
 El Dorado (24kGoldn album) (2021)
 El Dorado (Aterciopelados album) (1995)
 El Dorado (Shakira album) (2017)
 Eldorado (EP) (1989), an EP by Neil Young and The Restless
 Eldorado , a 2007 album by Stephan Eicher
 Eldorado, a 2016 album by Ro James
 El Dorado, a 2009 album by 17 Hippies
 El Dorado, a 2008 album by James Wilsey
 El Dorado, a 1997 soundtrack of Ace Combat 2
 El Dorado, a 2020 album by Marcus King

Songs
 "Eldorado" (song), a 1974 song by Electric Light Orchestra
 "El Dorado" (song), a 2010 song by Iron Maiden
 "El Dorado", a 1991 composition by John Adams
 "El Dorado", a song by Death Cab for Cutie from Kintsugi
 "Eldorado", a 1985 song by Drum Theatre
 "El Dorado", a 2014 song by Every Time I Die from From Parts Unknown
 "El Dorado", a 2005 song by 50 Foot Wave from Golden Ocean
 "Eldorado", a song by Joseph Hinton
 "El Dorado", a song by Elton John from the soundtrack to The Road to El Dorado
 "El.Do.Ra.Do", a 1987 song by Seikima-II from From Hell with Love
 "Eldorado", a 1992 song by the Tragically Hip from Fully Completely
 "El Dorado", a 2012 song by Two Steps from Hell from SkyWorld
"El Dorado," a 2016 song by Marillion from FEAR
 "Eldorado", a 1980 song by Goombay Dance Band
 "El Dorado", a song by EXO
 "El Dorado", a 1988 song by Restless Heart from Big Dreams in a Small Town
 "El Dorado (Can't Stop Now!)", a song by Ashley McBryde from the 2018 album Girl Going Nowhere

Television
 "Eldorado" (Boardwalk Empire), an episode of the series Boardwalk Empire
 El Dorado (Super Friends), a character in Super Friends
 Eldorado (TV series), a 1992–1993 BBC soap opera
 El Dorado (miniseries) a 2010 mini series shot in Peru directed by Terry Cunningham

Brands and enterprises
 ElDorado (bus manufacturer), a bus company
 El Dorado Furniture, an American furniture company
 El Dorado Rum, a brand of Guyanese rum
 Eldorado Amusement Park, New Jersey, US

Science and technology
 Cray XMT or Eldorado, a supercomputer
 El Dorado, a hop variety
 Eldorado Institute, a non-profit research, development and innovation institution with its headquarters located in Campinas, São Paulo, Brasil

Nightlife
 Eldorado (Berlin), performance venues in Berlin, Weimar Republic
 Eldorado Casino, a casino in Henderson, Nevada, US
 Eldorado Resort Casino, a hotel and casino in Reno, Nevada, US

Mines
 El Dorado Gold Mine, Fairbanks, Alaska, US
 Eldorado Mine (Northwest Territories), Port Radium, Northwest Territories, Canada
 Eldorado Mine (Saskatchewan), near Uranium City, Saskatchewan, Canada
 El Dorado, a proposed mine project of the Pacific Rim Mining Corporation

Other uses
 El Dorado (Colombian football), a period of Colombian football
 El Dorado (restaurant), Puerto Vallarta, Mexico
 El Dorado (side-wheeler)
 The El Dorado, a co-op apartment building in New York City
 Cadillac Eldorado, an automobile

See also
 El Dorado Canyon (disambiguation)
 El Dorado High School (disambiguation)
 Dorado (disambiguation)
 
 
 Helldorado (disambiguation)